Japonica Polonica Fantastica, also known as JPF, is the oldest Polish manga publisher, founded in 1996 in Olecko. The first titles (Aż do nieba, Czarodziejka z Księżyca [volumes 1–8]) were translated by JPF's founder, Shin Yasuda. At the end of 1998, Rafał "Kabura" Rzepka took over the role of translator. In 2006 the publishing house moved to Mierzyn near Szczecin, Poland. Currently, translators: Paweł Dybała, Michał Żmijewski, Urszula Knap and Monika Nowicka are responsible for translating manga.

Publishing policy
Manga published by JPF have varying release schedules. They include biweekly (some Dragon Ball volumes), monthly (e.g. Czarodziejka z Księżyca, Naruto), bimonthly (e.g. Tajemnica przeszłości, Fullmetal Alchemist) and quarterly (e.g. Akira). Most of the comics have a pocket format (close to B6), although it is not the rule. Some come with so-called "boxy" - boxes for singular volumes (e.g. Legend of Lemnear, Neon Genesis Evangelion) or for several parts of a given series (e.g. six boxes for nineteen volumes of Akira). JPF's mangas also vary in layout - most series retain the Japanese page order (original layout), however some present a mirror image of the original (left-to-right page layout).

Titles published

Manga

.hack//Bransoleta Zmierzchu
7 Miliardów Igieł
Abara
Akira
All You Need Is Kill
Angel Sanctuary
Another
Atak Tytanów
Atak Tytanów - Bez żalu
Aż do nieba
Battle Angel Alita
Berserk
Black Paradox
Blame!
Bleach
Blue Heaven
Było ich jedenaścioro
Chirality
Chobits
Cowboy Bebop
Crying Freeman
Czarodziejka z Księżyca
Death Note
D.N.Angel
Doubt
Dr. Slump
Dragon Ball
Drifters
Fullmetal Alchemist
Fushigi Yuugi
Ghost in the Shell
Ghost in the Shell 2
Ghost in the Shell 1.5
Gra w króla
Green Blood
Goth
Gyo
Hasło brzmi: Sailor V
Heat
Hellsing
Hideout
Hiroki Endo - krótkie historie
Judge
Klan Poe
Kobato.
Legend of Lemnear
Magiczni Wojownicy – Slayers
Mój drogi bracie...
Naruto
Neon Genesis Evangelion
Oh! My Goddess
One Piece
One-Punch Man
Ouran High School Host Club
Pieśń Apolla
Plastic Little
Pokémon Adventures
Record of Lodoss War
Remina - gwiazda piekieł
RESIDENT EVIL marhawa desire
Rewolucja według Ludwika
Róża Wersalu
Służąca Przewodnicząca
Souichi i jego głupie klątwy
Soul Eater
Tokyo Mew Mew
Tomie
Uzumaki
Vampire Princess Miyu
Wish
Wolf's Rain
Wzgórze Apolla
X Clamp

External links
 Japonica Polonia Fantastica - Publisher's official site

Comic book publishing companies of Poland
Manga distributors
Publishing companies established in 1996
1996 establishments in Poland